Rolf Hellem (26 December 1923 – 6 June 2021) was a Norwegian politician for the Labour Party.

He was elected to the Norwegian Parliament from Nordland in 1965, and was re-elected on three occasions. He had previously served in the position of deputy representative during the term 1958–1961, during which he met as a regular representative meanwhile Kolbjørn Sigurd Verner Varmann was appointed to the Cabinet, and also during the term 1961–1965.

Hellem was involved in local politics in Ankenes from 1951 to 1955. He died in June 2021 at the age of 97.

References

External links

1923 births
2021 deaths
Labour Party (Norway) politicians
Members of the Storting
20th-century Norwegian politicians
People from Frøya, Trøndelag